Ramadan Kheyl (also Romanized as Ramadān Kheyl) is a village in Peyrajeh Rural District, in the Central District of Neka County, Mazandaran Province, Iran. At the 2006 census, its population was 115, in 29 families.

References 

Populated places in Neka County